Long Yellow Road may refer to:
 "Long Yellow Road," a musical composition by jazz pianist and bandleader Toshiko Akiyoshi
 Long Yellow Road (Toshiko Akiyoshi Trio album), a 1961 jazz trio album
Toshiko Akiyoshi in Japan, aka Long Yellow Road, a 1970 jazz quartet album
 Long Yellow Road (Toshiko Akiyoshi – Lew Tabackin Big Band album), a 1975 big band album
 My Long Yellow Road, a 2017 solo piano recording by Toshiko Akiyoshi.